This is a list of human anatomy mnemonics, categorized and alphabetized. For mnemonics in other medical specialties, see this list of medical mnemonics.

Bones

Bones of the Upper Limbs
How Rare U Cook Mesquite Pork?

Hurry! Ralph Untie Carol's Mini Pechay

He Races Until Chunky Men Pace 

Humerus
Radius
Ulna
Carpal bones
Metacarpal bones
Phalanges
(In order from proximal to distal)

Bones of the Arm
"Ultra Red Hair"

"Ultimate Rave Headquarters

Usually Really Hard 

Unemployment Rises High
Ulna
Radius
Humerus

Ulna
Understand

Listen

Name

A bone

Bones of the Hand
"Please Make Cookies"

"Please Massage Chest"

People Make Choices 
Phalanges 
Metacarpal bones 
Carpal bones 
(These are in order from the distal end of the fingertips to the wrist)

Carpal bones
 Carpal Bones:
Sally Left The Party To Take Cathy Home:

She Looks Too Pretty Try To Catch Her:

Some Lovers Try Positions That They Can't Handle:
Scaphoid, Lunate, Triquetrum, Pisiform, Trapezium, Trapezoid, Capitate, Hamate.

Carpal bones: 
So Long To Pinky, Here Comes The Thumb:
Scaphoid, Lunate, Triquetrum, Pisiform, Hamate, Capitate, Trapezoid, Trapezium.

Carpal Bones:
""" T T Table Par Chillate hui Sunny Leone """,,,,APG-007

Bones of the Phalanges
Damn My Pinky!

Dick Move Pal!

Distance My People 

Don't Make Problems 
Distal phalanx 
Middle phalanx 
Proximal phalanx
(From distal to proximal.)

Bones of the Lower Limbs
From Pennies To Fives They May Pay
Femur
Patella
Tibia
Fibula
Tarsal bones
Metatarsal bones
Phalanges
(In order from proximal to distal.)

Bones of the head

Cranial Bones
F POETS "Fluffy Puppies On Every Third Street"

Fit People Occasionally Eat Table Salt

Fat People Only Eat Thick Steak 

Funny People Over Entertainment Try Songs
Frontal
Parietal
Occipital
Ethmoid
Temporal
Sphenoid

Fraternity Parties Occasionally Teach Spam Etiquette
Frontal
Parietal
Occipital
Temporal
Sphenoid
Ethmoid

Old People From Texas Eat Spiders
Occipital
Parietal
Frontal
Temporal
Ethmoid
Sphenoid

Vomer
Very bad

Odor

Makes my

Eyes

Run

Bones of the Pectoral Girdle and Arm
CS

Continuous Starvation

Clearwater Sucks

Crazy Seals 
Clavicle 
Scapula

Spine (Vertebral Column) 
Can This Little Servant Cook ?

 Cervical vertebrae (Atlas (anatomy) = C1, Axis (anatomy) = C2)
 Thoracic vertebrae
 Lumbar vertebrae
 Sacral vertebrae
 Coccygeal vertebrae
(These are in order superior to inferior- or starting from the top of the spine to the bottom.)

"Can Tall Ladies Sit Comfortably"

"Can The Ladies Stand Comfortably"  

"Candy Takes Liking Stripping Catiously"

Can Tinkerbell Let Stars Collide 

 Breakfast at 7:00 - 7 cervical vertebrae
 Lunch at 12:00 - 12 thoracic vertebrae
 Dinner at 5:00 - 5 lumbar vertebrae

Projections of Bone
PTTTCC
"People Take Teaspoons Temporarily Causing Constipation
Process
Tubercle
Tuberosity
Trochanter
Condyle
Crest

Humerus tubercles (Bone projections) 
Humerus tubercles

Girls In Leadership

 Greater tubercle 
 Intertubercular groove
 Lesser tubercle

Bone Markings of Humerus
Let's Rewatch Criminal Minds

Let's Roll Clay Moons
L-lateral epicondyle
R-radial fossa
C-coronoid fossa
M-medial epicondyle

Holes and Depressions in Bones
FFNF
"Fireman Fight Notorious Fires

Flowers Flow Neatly Fabulously 

Family Feuds are No Fun 
 Foramen
 Fissure 
 Notch 
 Fossa

Muscles

Rotator Cuff Muscles
SITS

"Sit In The Seat" / The humerus SITS in the glenoid fossa

Shit I Trusted Sam

Swimming In The Summer 

She Is The Scientist
Supraspinatus 
Infraspinatus 
Teres Minor 
Subscapularis

Scooby Investigated The Mysterious Scene
Supraspinatus
Infraspinatus
Teres Minor
Subscapularis

Flexor muscles of the forearm 
3 Bs bend the elbow: (in order of location)

  Biceps brachii 
  Brachialis
  Brachioradialis

Anterior Flexor Muscles of the Forearm
Cats Run Circles Under Dogs Stomachs

Can't Really Come Until Day Six
Carpi
Radialis
Carpi
Ulnaris
Digitorum
Superficialis

Anterior leg Compartment (muscles) 
"The Hospitals Are Not Dirty Places"
Tibialis anterior
extensor Hallucis longus
anterior tibial Artery
deep fibular Nerve
extensor Digitorum longus
Peroneus tertius [aka fibularis tertius]

"Those Horses Are Never Doing Pilates"
Tibialis anterior
extensor Hallucis longus
anterior tibial Artery
deep fibular Nerve
extensor Digitorum longus
Peroneus tertius [aka fibularis tertius]

"Tom Had A Night Down Town"
Tibialis anterior
extensor Hallucis longus
anterior tibial Artery
deep fibular Nerve
extensor Digitorum longus
Tertius for fibularis tertius

Posterior Leg Compartment (Posterior Ankle Structures)
Tom Dig A Nice Hole
Tibialis posterior 
Flexor Digitorum longus
Artery - Posterior tibial artery 
Nerve - Tibial nerve 
Flexor Hallucis longus

Tom, Dick, And Very Naughty Harry
Tibialis posterior 
Flexor Digitorum longus
Posterior tibial Artery
Posterior tibial Vein 
Tibial Nerve 
Flexor Hallucis longus

Joint, suture, ligament, tendon

Joint In The Wrist
RIC
"Rice Is Curing
Radiocarpal
Intercarpal
Carpometacarpal

RIC
"Really Interesting Crap
Radiocarpal
Intercarpal
Carpometacarpal

Roads In California
Radiocarpal
Intercarpal 
Carpometacarpal

Rum In Coke
Radiocarpal
Intercarpal 
Carpometacarpal

Joints/Sutures of Skull
CLSS
"Crazy Llamas Sassing Santa
Coronal suture
Lambdoid suture
Squamosal suture
Sagittal suture

The Lazy Cat Sleeps Safely
Temporomandibular joint
Lambdoid suture
Coronal suture
Squamous suture
Sagittal suture
"Come Sing Love Songs"
Coronal Suture
Sagittal Suture
Lambdoid Suture
Squamous Suture

"Come Smoke L 's Sam
Coronal Suture
Sagittal Suture
Lambdoid Suture
Squamous Suture

"Can Seagulls Lift Snacks
Coronal Suture
Sagittal Suture
Lambdoid Suture
Squamous Suture

Pes anserinus
A mnemonic to remember the muscles that contribute tendons to the pes anserinus and the innervations of these muscles is SGT FOT (sergeant FOT)
S- Sartorius 
G- Gracilis 
T- semiTendinosus  (from anterior to posterior). 
F- femoral nerve 
O- obturator nerve 
T- tibial division of the sciatic nerve. 
Notice the order of the muscles (S, G, T) follows the order of the innervating nerves which correspond to those muscles (F, O, T)

Another anterior to posterior is “Say Grace before Tea” Sartorius, Gracilis, semiTendinosus.

Vessels

Celiac trunk(Coeliac trunk): branches
Left Hand Side (LHS):

Left gastric artery
Hepatic artery
Splenic artery

Tributaries of the Inferior vena cava
"I Like To Rise So High"
Iliac vein (common)
Lumbar vein
Testicular (gonadal) vein (direct tributary on right side; empties into left renal vein -> IVC on left side) 
Renal vein
Suprarenal vein (same drainage as gonadal vein)
Hepatic vein

Subclavian artery
The branches of the subclavian artery can be remembered using VITamin C and D.

 Vertebral Artery
 Internal Thoracic Artery
 Thyrocervical Trunk
 Costocervical Artery
 Dorsal Scapular Artery

Internal iliac artery: branches
I Like Going Places Using My Very Own Unmanned Vehicle

Posterior division:
Iliolumbar artery
Lateral sacral artery
Superior gluteal artery

Anterior division:
Inferior gluteal artery
Internal pudendal artery
Umbilical artery
Middle rectal artery
Superior and inferior vesical artery
Obturator artery
Uterine artery (female)
Vaginal artery (female)

Contents of canal & foramen

Mediastinum

Superior mediastinum 
The contents of superior mediastinum can be remembered using the mnemonic,  "TT ET AV N LO"

or

"Try To Eat Toast And Vitamins Now Little Oliver"

 Thymus
 Trachea
 Esophagus
 Thoracic duct
 Aortic arch
 Veins (Superior vena cava, brachiocephalic vein, left superior intercostal vein)
 Nerves (Vagus nerve, phrenic nerve, left recurrent laryngeal nerve)
 Lymphatics
 Other small arteries and veins

Inferior mediastinum

Anterior inferior mediastinum
The contents of anterior inferior mediastinum can be remembered using the mnemonic,  "RT LN"

or

"ReTweet Light Novels!"

 Remnants of the Thymus (inferior portion of thymus)
 Lymph Nodes

Middle inferior mediastinum
The contents of middle inferior mediastinum can be remembered using the mnemonic,  "PHP P ASP" or "PHP plus ASP"

or

"'Personal Home Page' plus 'Active Server Pages'"

 Phrenic nerve
 Heart
 Pericardium
 Pericardiacophrenic artery
 Ascending aorta
 Superior vena cava
 Pulmonary trunk

Posterior inferior mediastinum
The contents of posterior inferior mediastinum can be remembered using the mnemonic,  "DATE VSL"

or

"on the DATE Vivian Slapped Larry"

 Descending thoracic aorta
 Azygos veins (hemiazygos veins, accessory hemiazygos veins)
 Thoracic duct (Cisterna chyli)
 Esophagus (Esophageal plexus)
 Vagus nerve
 Splanchnic nerve (greater splanchnic nerve, lesser splanchnic nerve, least splanchnic nerve)
 Lymphatics

The contents of posterior mediastinum can be remembered using the mnemonic,  "DATES"
Descending aorta
Azygous vein and hemiazygos vein
Thoracic duct
Esophagus
Sympathetic trunk/ganglia.

Foramen magnum
Contents of the foramen magnum: VAMPS-AT-SD

or

VAMPires Sing AT SD card
 Vertebral arteries
 Anterior spinal artery
 Meninges associated with the spinal cord
 Posterior spinal arteries
 Spinal roots of the accessory nerve (CN XI)
 Apical ligament of the dens
 Tectorial membrane
 Spinal cord
 Dural veins (Dural venous sinuses)

Contents of the foramen magnum: VAMPS-ATM

or
 
VAMPires Sing AT Midnight
Vertebral arteries
Anterior spinal artery
Meningeal branches of the cervical nerves
Posterior spinal arteries
Spinal part of the accessory nerve
Alar and apical ligaments of the dens
Tectorial membrane
Medulla oblongata

Greater sciatic foramen
Structures passing through greater sciatic foramen below piriformis (S.N.I.P. N.I.P.)
sciatic nerve
nerve to obturator internus
internal pudendal vessel
pudendal nerve
nerve to quadratus femoris
inferior gluteal vessels
posterior cutaneous nerve of thigh

Lesser sciatic foramen
Structures passing through lesser sciatic foramen: (P.I.N.T.) 
pudendal nerve
internal pudendal vessels
nerve to obturator internus
tendon of obturator internus

Tarsal tunnel
a mnemonic to remember the contents of the Tarsal tunnel from anterior to posterior is "Tom, Dick and Harry". or alternatively "Tom, Dick (and very nervous) Harry" if the artery, vein, and nerve are included.

Femoral triangle
The femoral triangle is shaped like the sail of a sailing ship and hence its boundaries can be remembered using the mnemonic, "SAIL":
Sartorius
Adductor longus
Inguinal Ligament.

The order of structures in the femoral triangle is important in the embalming of bodies, as the femoral artery is often exposed and used to pump embalming fluids into the body. The order of this neurovascular bundle can be remembered using the mnemonic, "NAVY":
Nerve
Artery
Vein
Y -fronts (the British term of a style of men's underwear with a "Y" shaped front that acts as a fly). The "Y" is midline (corresponding with the penis) and the mnemonic always reads from lateral to medial (in other words, the Femoral Nerve is always lateral).

An alternate to this mnemonic is "NAVEL" for Nerve, Artery, Vein, Empty Space and Lymph, to include the deep inguinal lymph nodes located medial to the Femoral vein.

Popliteal fossa
A useful mnemonic to remember popliteal fossa anatomy (medial-to-lateral arrangement) is: Serve And Volley Next Ball. 
S: semimembranosus and semitendinosus (superior medial border) 
A: artery (popliteal artery) 
V: vein (popliteal vein) 
N: nerve (tibial nerve) 
B: biceps femoris  (superior lateral border).  The lateral and medial heads of gastrocnemius form the inferior border.

Carotid sheath contents
I See 10 CC's in the IV:p. 1

I See (I.C.) = Internal Carotid artery
10 = CN 10 (Vagus nerve)
CC = Common Carotid artery
IV = Internal Jugular Vein

Cavernous sinus contents
O TOM CAT:p. 1

O TOM are lateral wall components, in order from superior to inferior.

CA are the components within the sinus, from medial to lateral. CA ends at the level of T from O TOM.

Occulomotor nerve (III)
Trochlear nerve (IV)
Ophthalmic nerve (V1)
Maxillary nerve (V2)
Carotid artery
Abducent nerve (VI)
T: When written, connects to the T of OTOM

Vertebral level

Diaphragm apertures: spinal levels
Many mnemonics are used for diaphragm apertures including:

(V)oice (O)f (A)merica
number of letters = vertebral level

 V - vena cava - T8 
 O - oesophagus - T10
 A - aortic hiatus - T12

Vena cava = 8 letters = T8p. 1
Oesophagus = 10 letters = T10
Aortic hiatus = 12 letters = T12

Openings of the diaphragm and structures passing through 
"I Read, Very Old, And Torn Articles." - (IVC, Right phrenic nerve), (Vagus nerve, Oesophagus), (Aorta, Thoracic duct, Azygos vein).

Openings of the diaphragm and structures passing through

 Caval opening (vena caval foramen) (2: IR): Inferior vena cava, (branches of the) Right phrenic nerve
 Esophageal hiatus (2: VO): (anterior and posterior) Vagal trunks, Oesophagus
 Aortic hiatus (3: ATA): (descending) Aorta, Thoracic duct, Azygos vein

I ate 10 eggs at 12
I = IVC 
ate = T8
10 = T10
Eggs = Esophagus
At = Aorta
12 = T12

Sternal angle
The sternal angle marks the approximate level of the 2nd pair of costal cartilages, which attach to the second ribs, and the level of the intervertebral disc between T4 and T5. In clinical applications, the sternal angle can be palpated at the T4 vertebral level.

The sternal angle is used in the definition of the thoracic plane. This marks the level of a number of other anatomical structures.

For structures lying at the level of the sternal angle, the following mnemonic can be used:

RAT PLLANT
 Rib 2
 Aortic arch
 Tracheal bifurcation
 Pulmonary trunk
 Ligamentum arteriosum
 Left recurrent laryngeal
 Azygos Vein
 Nerves (Cardiac and Pulmonary plexuses)
 Thoracic duct

PLOT of EARTH PLLANTS
is a more detailed mnemonic including:
 Phrenic and Vagus Nerve
 Lymph Nodes
 Oblique fissure of lungs (top of it)
 Thymus
 Esophagus (trending right to left)
 Aortic Arch (bottom of the arch)
 Rib 2, Manubrium-sternal angle, T4(more specifically T4-5 disc)
 Tracheal Bifurcation (Carina: Latin –like keel of boat)
 Heart
 Pulmonary trunk bifurcation 
 L2 : Left Recurrent Laryngeal (Looping under Aorta); Ligamentum Arteriosum:  Connects Aortic Arch to Pulmonary. Bifurcation
 Azygous vein arches over the root of the Rt. Lung and opens in SVC.
 Nerve plexi:  Cardiac and Pulmonary Plexus
 Thoracic duct (on its way to drain into the Left Subclavian)
 SVC going down

Neuroanatomy

Afferent vs efferent
Afferent connection arrives and an efferent connection exits.

Brachial plexus
Remember To Drink Cold Beer - Roots, Trunks, Divisions, Cords, Branches 

5 main nerves of brachial plexus.
"My Aunty Rocks My Uncle" - Musculocutaneous, Axillary, Radial, Median, Ulnar. (in order laterally to medially)
"My Uncle Rapes My Aunt" - Musculocutaneous (L), Ulnar (M), Radial (P), Median (LM), Axillary (P). (L: lateral cord, M: medial cord, P: posterior cord. LM: both lateral and medial cords. Memorize "LMP LMP".)

Lateral cord branches
LLM "Lucy Loves Me" - Lateral pectoral, Lateral root of the median nerve, Musculocutaneous.
 Love Me Lucy (LML) - Lateral pectoral nerve, Musculocutaneous nerve, Lateral root of Median nerve.
 Look My Lancer - Lateral pectoral nerve, Musculocutaneous nerve, Lateral root of Median nerve.

Medial cord branches
MMMUM "Most Medical Men Use Morphine" - Medial pectoral, Medial cutaneous nerve of arm, Medial cutaneous nerve of forearm, Ulnar, Medial root of the Median nerve.
"Money Makes Many Men Unhappy" - Medial pectoral nerve, Medial cutaneous nerve of arm, Medial cutaneous nerve of forearm, Medial root of median nerve, Ulnar nerve.
"M4U" - Medial pectoral nerve, Medial cutaneous nerve of arm, Medial cutaneous nerve of forearm, Medial root of median nerve, Ulnar nerve.
 Union of 4 Medials - Ulnar nerve, Medial cutaneous nerve of arm, Medial cutaneous nerve of forearm, Medial pectoral nerve, Medial root of Median nerve.

Posterior cord branches
STAR - Subscapular (upper and lower), Thoracodorsal, Axillary, Radial.
 RATS- Radial nerve, Axillary nerve, Thoracodorsal nerve, Subscapular (Upper & Lower) nerve.
ULTRA - Upper subscapular, Lower subscapular, Thoracodorsal, Radial, Axillary.
 ULNAR- Upper subscapular nerve, Lower subscapular nerve, Nerve to latissimus dorsi, Axillary nerve, Radial nerve.

Cerebellum
Deep cerebellar nuclei and their positions relative to the midline: "Fat Guys Eat Donuts," where each letter indicates the medial to lateral location in the cerebellar white matter.

Or inversely, "Don't Eat Greasy Food", where each letter indicates the lateral to medial location in the cerebellar white matter.

fastigial nucleus
globose nucleus
emboliform nucleus
dentate nucleus

Cranial nerves

12 Cranial Nerves 
"Oh, oh, oh, to touch and feel very good velvet ... ah, heaven."

Oh, Oh, Oh, To Touch A Fit Virgin Girl's Vagina (And Hymen)

 CN I Olfactory nerve
 CN II Optic nerve
 CN III Oculomotor nerve
 CN IV Trochlear nerve (Pathetic nerve)
 CN V Trigeminal nerve (Dentist's nerve)
 CN VI Abducens nerve
 CN VII Facial nerve
 CN VIII Vestibulocochlear nerve (Auditory nerve)
 CN IX Glossopharyngeal nerve
 CN X Vagus nerve
 CN XI Accessory nerve (Spinal accessory nerve)
 CN XII Hypoglossal nerve

OOOh the 2 Traceys Are From Virgina Good cause Virginans Are Hilarious

On, On, On, They Traveled And Found Voldemort Guarding Very Ancient Horcruxes

There are many mnemonics for the names of the cranial nerves, e.g.
 "OOOTTAFAGVSH" is "OLd OPen OCeans TROuble TRIbesmen ABout Fish VEnom Giving VArious ACute/SPlitting Headaches" (a mnemonic that gives enough letters to distinguish between nerves that start with the same letter), or "On old Olympus's towering tops, a Finn and German viewed some hops," and for the initial letters "OOOTTAFVGVAH" is "Oh, oh, oh, to touch and feel very good velvet ... ah, heaven."  The differences between these depend on "vestibulocochlear nerve" versus "acoustic nerve" and "accessory nerve" versus "spinal accessory nerve".

Old Ollie Oson Teaches Teenagers About Fashion Very Gladly Very Adequately Hilarious 

Only Our Old Trusty Vodka And Friends Validate Great Victories, So Harmonious.

One Orange Orangutan Tries To Avoid Fragile Vines & Gracefully Vacates All Hazards

Ongoing Optimism Only Teaches True Amazing Fundamentals Varying Globally Versatile And Honesty

Only Old Otters Take Time And Find Very Good Values At Hand

Only One Ounce To Take Another Farmer's Very Great Vest And Hat

Functions of the Cranial Nerves
motor (M), sensory (S), or both (B)

Some Say Marry Money, But My Brother Says Big Business Makes Money.

A common example mnemonic for remembering which nerves are motor (M), sensory (S), or both (B), "Some Say Marry Money But My Brother Says Benevolent Bride Matters More". There are a very large number of additional mnemonics.

Summertime Seems More Majestic Because Multiple Bystanders Sing Brilliant Ballads Making Masterpieces

Silly Sally Makes Many Big Muffins But Sally Bakes Big Macarons Moreover

Some  Sundays Make Me Bored, My Brother Stays Busy Building Miniature Models

Some Say Moms Make Boys Magnificent Because She Babies Boys Much More

Sometimes She May Muster Big Motors Because She Believes Both Men Matter

Some Say Marry Money But My Brother Says Big Brains Matter More

Some Say Marry Money, But My Buddy Says Brilliant Brains Make Money

3 branches of the trigeminal nerve (CN V) 
Standing room only can be used to remember that:
 V1 (ophthalmic nerve) passes through the superior orbital fissure
 V2 (maxillary nerve) through the foramen rotundum
 V3 (mandibular nerve) through the foramen ovale.

5 branches of the facial nerve (CN VII) 
For the five branches of the facial nerve there are: "Two Zebras Bit My Cookie" or "To Zanzibar By MotorCar" or "To Zoo By My Car"

 Temporal branch
 Zygomatic branch
 Buccal branch
 Marginal mandibular branch
 Cervical branch

Lateral geniculate nucleus (thalamus) 
In neuroanatomy, the lateral geniculate nucleus is a structure in the thalamus and a key component of the mammalian visual pathway.

A simple mnemonic for remembering which layers of lateral geniculate body are synapsed with the ganglion cells of the ipsilateral or contralateral optic nerve is "See I? I see, I see," with "see" representing the C in "contralateral," and "I" representing the I in "ipsilateral." (CIICIC)

Another is "Emily and Pete meet eye to eye" as in "M and P meet I to I," or again, "Magno and Parvo meet Ipsi to Ipsi." (MMPPPP)

Another way of remembering which layers of lateral geniculate body are synapsed with the ganglion cells of the ipsilateral or contralateral optic nerve is 2+3=5 (layers II, III and V), which is correct, so it is from the same (ipsilateral) side as the ganglion cells from the side of question, while at the same time 1+4 doesn't equal 6, so the remaining layers (I, IV, and VI) are synapsing with ganglion cells of the other (contralateral) optic nerve.

Coronal section of brain (structures)
"In Extremis, Cannibals Eat People's Globus Pallidi Instead of Their Hearts":

From insula to midline:
 Insula 
 Extream capsule
 Claustrum
 External capsule
 Putamen
 Globus pallidus
 Internal capsule
 Thalamus
 Hypothalamus

Anterior Pituitary Hormones
FLAG TOP

FSH
LH
ACTH
GH
TSH
MelanOcyte Stimulating Hormone
Prolactin

Etc.

Bowel components
"Dow Jones Industrial Average Closing Stock Report"

From proximal to distal:
Duodenum
Jejunum
Ileum
Appendix
Colon
Sigmoid
Rectum

Duodenum: lengths of parts
"Counting 1 to 4 but staggered":p. 1
1st part: 2 inches
2nd part: 3 inches
3rd part: 4 inches
4th part: 1 inch

Endocrine glands
The major glands of the endocrine system, excluding ovaries and testes: "T-A-P." (T2, A3, P4)
Thymus
Thyroid
Anterior pituitary
Adrenal cortex
Adrenal medulla
Posterior pituitary
Parathyroid gland
Pancreas
Pineal

G.I. tract layers (simplified)
M.S.M.S.

Mucosa
Submucosa
Muscularis propria (or muscularis externa)
Serosa (or adventitia)

Kidney functions
A WET BED

A – maintaining ACID-base balance
W – maintaining WATER balance
E – ELECTROLYTE balance
T – TOXIN removal
B – BLOOD Pressure control
E – making ERYTHROPOIETIN
D – Vitamin D metabolism

Placenta-crossing substances
WANT My Hot Dog

Wastes
Antibodies
Nutrients
Teratogens
Microorganisms
Hormones, HIV
Drugs

Layers of the retina
A mnemonic to remember the layers of the retina:

Sperm: path through male reproductive system
"My boyfriend's name is STEVE":
Seminiferous Tubules
Epididymis
Vas deferens
Ejaculatory duct

Connective Tissue and Fascicles 
 Every -Endomysium
 Person- Perimysium
 Eats- Epimysium
 Food - Fascia

Intraperitoneal and Retroperitoneal Organs 
 Retroperitoneal organs in abdominal cavity (secondarily retroperitoneal organs are starred)
 SAD PUCKER (includes esophagus, excludes inferior vena cava):
 Suprarenal (adrenal) glands
 Aorta
 Duodenum (distal 1st part - 4th part)*
 Pancreas*
 Ureter
 Colon (ascending and descending)*
 Kidney
 Esophagus
 Rectum
 KID CARPUS (includes inferior vena cava, excludes esophagus)
 Kidney
 Inferior vena cava
 Duodenum (distal 1st part - 4th part)*
 Colon (ascending and descending)*
 Aorta
 Rectum
 Pancreas (head and body)*
 Ureter
 Suprarenal (adrenal) glands

 Intraperitoneal Organs
 DJ CLASS PIG
 Duodenum (proximal 1st part)
 Jejunum
 Colon (cecum, transverse, sigmoid)
 Liver
 Appendix
 Stomach
 Spleen
 Pancreas (tail)
 Ileum
 Gallbladder

See also 
 Brachial plexus
 Cranial nerve
 List of medical mnemonics

References 

19. ScienceMnemonic - An Easy Way To Memorize Your Science Knowledge Using Mnemonics, Pictures, Visuals, Acronyms, Usage, Examples, Or Word Games.

anatomy mnemonics
+anatomy mnemonics
+anat